The Mack Canyon Archeological Site (Smithsonian trinomial: 35SH23) is a prehistoric archeological site in Sherman County, Oregon, United States. Consisting of an extensive series of pit houses in a sheltered canyon, the site was occupied seasonally in winter by Columbia River tribes for about 7,000 years from after 5000 BCE to the early 19th century CE.

The site was added to the National Register of Historic Places in 1975.

See also
National Register of Historic Places listings in Sherman County, Oregon

References

National Register of Historic Places in Sherman County, Oregon
Archaeological sites on the National Register of Historic Places in Oregon
Bureau of Land Management areas in Oregon